Paungbyin is a village in Kalaw Township, Taunggyi District, Shan State, of Myanmar. It lies in the Inle Valley north of Inle Lake.

References

External links
"Paungbyin Map — Satellite Images of Paungbyin" Maplandia

Populated places in Shan State